A bellcrank is a type of crank that changes motion through an angle. The angle can be any angle from 0 to 360 degrees, but 90 degrees and 180 degrees are most common. The name comes from its first use, changing the vertical pull on a rope to a horizontal pull on the striker of a bell, used for calling staff in large houses or commercial establishments.

Angles
A typical 90 degree bellcrank consists of an "L" shaped crank pivoted where the two arms of the L meet. Moving rods (or cables or ropes) are attached to the ends of the L arms. When one is pulled, the L rotates around the pivot point, pulling on the other arm. A typical 180 degree bellcrank consists of a straight bar pivoted in the center. When one arm is pulled or pushed, the bar rotates around the pivot point, pulling or pushing on the other arm.

Mechanical advantage
Changing the length of the arms changes the mechanical advantage of the system. Many applications do not change the direction of motion but instead amplify a force "in line", which a bellcrank can do in a limited space. There is a tradeoff between range of motion, linearity of motion, and size. The greater the angle traversed by the crank, the more non-linear the motion becomes (the more the motion ratio changes).

Applications

Aircraft
Bellcranks are often used in aircraft control systems to connect the pilot's controls to the control surfaces. For example: on light aircraft, the rudder often has a bellcrank whose pivot point is the rudder hinge. A cable connects the pilot's rudder pedal to one side of the bellcrank. When the pilot pushes on the rudder pedal, the rudder rotates on its hinge. The opposite rudder pedal is connected to the other end of the bellcrank to rotate the rudder in the opposite direction. Also referred to as a control horn.

Automotive
Bellcranks are also seen in automotive applications, as part of the linkage connecting the throttle pedal to the carburetor, and connecting the brake pedal to the master brake cylinder. In vehicle suspensions, bellcranks are used in pushrod-style suspensions in automobiles or in the Christie suspension in tanks. Vertically mounted suspensions may not be feasible in some vehicle designs due to space, aerodynamic, or other design constraints; bellcranks translate the vertical motion of the wheel into horizontal motion, allowing the suspension to be mounted transversely or longitudinally within the vehicle.

Bicycles 
Bellcranks are used in some internally geared hub assemblies to select the gearing. The motion from a Bowden cable is translated by a bellcrank to a pushrod which selects which portion of the epicyclic gears are driven by the bicycle's rear sprocket.

Residential flats 
Bellcrank mechanisms were installed at the top of entryway stairs in multi-unit Victorian and Edwardian homes (circa 1890 to 1930), particularly in the 
San Francisco Bay Area to allow residents to open and close the doors remotely so they would not need to walk down the stairs to welcome guests.

References

External links
 daerospace.com.

Mechanical engineering
Linkages (mechanical)